Penicillium sizovae is an anamorph species of fungus in the genus Penicillium which produces agroclavine-I and epoxyagroclavine-I.

References

Further reading 
 
 

sizovae
Fungi described in 1968